James Alexander Cameron (9 November 1930 – 19 January 2002) was an Australian politician. He was born at Coraki in New South Wales, the son of blacksmith Donald Cameron and Joyce Betheras. In 1948, when he was eighteen years old, he joined the Liberal Party and became a staff member. He was press secretary to Liberal leaders Pat Morton and Robert Askin 1955 – 1959. On 16 March 1963, he married Helen Bicket, with whom he had two daughters and four sons.

In 1968, Cameron was elected to the New South Wales Legislative Assembly as the Liberal member for Northcott. In 1973, he was appointed Speaker of the Legislative Assembly, holding the position until 1976. He was Deputy Opposition Leader for five months in 1981. He left the Assembly in 1984 to contest the Legislative Council for Fred Nile's Call to Australia group, which later became the Christian Democratic Party. He was successful, but six months later was forced to resign after a serious heart attack. Marie Bignold was appointed as his replacement. Despite having been the only MLC to vote against the Human Tissues Bill, which included provision for heart transplants, he required one himself after his heart attack. Cameron died at Avoca Beach in 2002.

One of his sons, Ross Cameron, is a former Liberal Party of Australia member for the federal seat of Parramatta.

References

1930 births
2002 deaths
Liberal Party of Australia members of the Parliament of New South Wales
Christian Democratic Party (Australia) politicians
Members of the New South Wales Legislative Assembly
Members of the New South Wales Legislative Council
Speakers of the New South Wales Legislative Assembly
20th-century Australian politicians